Nicholas Stoughton (20 September 1592 – 4 March 1648) was an English politician who sat in the House of Commons at various times between 1624 and 1648.

He was the son of Sir Lawrence Stoughton, MP and his wife Rose Ive, the stepdaughter of William Hammond, MP. He was the brother of George Stoughton, MP. He matriculated at New College, Oxford on 30 March 1610 aged 18.

He was a student of Inner Temple in 1613. In 1624, he was elected Member of Parliament for Guildford. He was a Justice of the Peace for Surrey from 1624 to his death and was appointed High Sheriff of Surrey for 1637–38.

In December 1645 he was elected MP for Guildford as a recruiter to the Long Parliament and sat until his death in 1648.

He married twice. Firstly Bridget, the daughter of Sir John Compton of Priors Dean, Hamshire, with whom he had two sons who predeceased him and two daughters and secondly Anne, the daughter of William Evans, Mercer, of London.

References

1592 births
1648 deaths
Alumni of New College, Oxford
Members of the Inner Temple
High Sheriffs of Surrey
English MPs 1624–1625
English MPs 1640–1648